Regina Kodymová-Jirkalová (born 22 January 1966) is a Czech sports shooter. She competed at the 1992 Summer Olympics and the 1996 Summer Olympics.

References

External links
 

1966 births
Living people
Czech female sport shooters
Olympic shooters of Czechoslovakia
Olympic shooters of the Czech Republic
Shooters at the 1992 Summer Olympics
Shooters at the 1996 Summer Olympics
Sportspeople from České Budějovice